Juan Pablo Raponi (born May 7, 1982 in Álvarez) is an Argentine footballer who plays for Gimnasia y Esgrima de Mendoza. He is nicknamed "Cachete".

Career

Raponi started his career with River Plate in 2001 under manager Ramón Díaz. After playing for several clubs in Argentina and Chile he was reunited with Díaz at Oxford United at the 4th level of English football. Díaz's time at Oxford was not very successful and he left in 2005, Raponi also returned to Argentina to play for Instituto. He then went on to play for Ponferradina and Racing de Ferrol in Spain. He played for Ecuadorian side Emelec during the late half of 2009.

In 2010, Raponi returned to Argentina by joining second division side Ferro Carril Oeste.

References

External links
 
 Argentine Primera statistics  
 

1982 births
Living people
People from Rosario Department
Association football midfielders
Argentine footballers
Argentine people of Italian descent
Club Atlético River Plate footballers
Universidad de Chile footballers
Club Atlético Banfield footballers
Olimpo footballers
Instituto footballers
Sportivo Luqueño players
Oxford United F.C. players
SD Ponferradina players
Lorca Deportiva CF footballers
Racing de Ferrol footballers
Ferro Carril Oeste footballers
Club Atlético 3 de Febrero players
Club Sol de América footballers
Gimnasia y Esgrima de Mendoza footballers
Argentine Primera División players
Chilean Primera División players
Segunda División players
Segunda División B players
Ecuadorian Serie A players
Paraguayan Primera División players
Argentine expatriate footballers
Argentine expatriate sportspeople in Spain
Expatriate footballers in Chile
Expatriate footballers in Spain
Expatriate footballers in England
Expatriate footballers in Paraguay
Expatriate footballers in Ecuador
Sportspeople from Santa Fe Province